Frank Henze (born 1 April 1977 in Leipzig) is a German slalom canoeist who competed at the international level from 1995 to 2013.

He won three medals in the C2 team event at the ICF Canoe Slalom World Championships with two silvers (2002, 2009) and a bronze (2010). He won six more medals at the European Championships in the same event (3 golds, 1 silver and 2 bronzes).

At the 2012 Summer Olympics he competed in the C2 event. He did not advance to the semifinals after finishing 11th in the qualifying round.

His partner in the boat between 1998 and 2002 was Kai Walter. From 2005 to 2013 he competed internationally with David Schröder.

His father Jürgen Henze was a world champion the C2 team event and his younger brother Stefan Henze was a silver medalist from the C2 event at the 2004 Summer Olympics in Athens.

World Cup individual podiums

References

 
12 September 2009 final results for the men's C2 team slalom event for the 2009 ICF Canoe Slalom World Championships. - accessed 12 September 2009.

External links 
 
 

1977 births
Living people
Sportspeople from Leipzig
People from Bezirk Leipzig
German male canoeists
Olympic canoeists of Germany
Canoeists at the 2012 Summer Olympics
Medalists at the ICF Canoe Slalom World Championships